New Frontier Party may refer to:

 New Frontier Party (Japan) (Shinshinto) of Japan
 Liberty Korea Party (Saenuri Party, New Frontier Party) of South Korea